The North Representative XI were a women's cricket team made up of players from across Northern England. They were formed in 2021 to take part in the Women's Twenty20 Cup, becoming the sixth team in the North Group to give the group an even number of teams: they finished 3rd, with 3 wins. They continued to compete in the 2022 Women's Twenty20 Cup, finishing sixth in their group of seven, but were removed from the competition ahead of the 2023 Women's Twenty20 Cup. Their squad included players from Lancashire, Cheshire, Cumbria, North East Warriors and Yorkshire, and they therefore had links with the regional sides North West Thunder and Northern Diamonds.

Seasons

Women's Twenty20 Cup

See also
 Lancashire Women cricket team
 North East Warriors
 Yorkshire Women cricket team
 Northern Diamonds
 North West Thunder

References

Cricket in Lancashire
Cricket in Yorkshire
Cricket in County Durham
Cricket in Northumberland
Women's cricket teams in England
2021 establishments in England
Cricket clubs established in 2021